David Kevin Van Horn (born September 17, 1960) is an American baseball coach and former infielder, who is the current head baseball coach of the Arkansas Razorbacks.

Playing career

Born in Stanton, California, Van Horn graduated from Winnetonka High School in Kansas City, Missouri in 1979. He then played junior college baseball at McLennan Community College in Texas for two years, earning all-conference and all-region honors as a freshman, while helping the Highlanders finish third in the JUCO World Series. His next season brought more individual and team success, as the team finished eighth in the nation and Van Horn earned All American and Region 5 Player of the Year accolades. Turning down the Chicago White Sox, who drafted him, he transferred to Arkansas for the 1982 season.

As a Razorback, Van Horn would earn All-Southwest Conference and SWC Newcomer of the Year awards for his performance. He was also recognized as team MVP. The Atlanta Braves selected Van Horn in the 10th round, where he would spend his next three years in the minor leagues.

Family
Coach Van Horn met his wife, the former Karen Lee, while serving as a graduate assistant at Arkansas. The couple has two daughters, Hollan and Mariel.

Alma mater
Arkansas, 1988
Masters of Science, East Texas State University (in Commerce, Texas), 1992

Team accomplishments
 
Dave Van Horn's first collegiate head coaching job was in 1994 for the Central Missouri State Mules, now called the University of Central Missouri. Van Horn coached that team (51-11 record) to their first NCAA Division II national championship, in the Division II College World Series.

Van Horn's subsequent teams have had plenty of success as well, reaching the College World Series nine times, seven occurring at Arkansas (2004, 2009, 2012, 2015, 2018, 2019, 2022), the other two during his tenure at Nebraska (2001 and 2002). As a graduate assistant at Arkansas he has reached the CWS twice more, in 1985 and 1987. Coach Van Horn also led 17 straight teams to the NCAA tournament, from 1999–2015.

Arkansas reached the SEC Tournament every year under Van Horn as head coach from 2003–2007 and again in 2009.  The 2008 team did not qualify for the SEC Tournament but qualified for the NCAA Tournament.

On April 5, 2015, Van Horn won his 500th game as the Arkansas coach.
On March 11, 2020, Van Horn won his 700th game as the Arkansas coach.

2009
Arkansas went 34-22 in 2009, and set University records for single-game attendance (11,434) total season attendance, (269,216) and actual attendance (173,946). Despite beating #1 Arizona State twice, the Hogs faltered at the end of the season, losing their final eight SEC games.

2009 College World Series

Arkansas returned to Omaha in 2009. The team won the Norman regional by knocking off top-eight seed Oklahoma. The Hogs next defeated Florida State twice at Dick Howser Stadium to punch their ticket to the College World Series. The Razorbacks were not expected to do well at the Series, but defeated the favored Cal State Fullerton Titans. Next, the Hogs were defeated by LSU, but staved off elimination the next day by beating Virginia in twelve innings. The Hogs were eliminated by eventual national champion LSU in game 11.

2012
Arkansas went 46-22 in 2012, which was the most wins in the Van Horn era and the most for a Razorback team since 1990, but limped into the postseason at the Houston Regional having lost both games it played at the SEC Tournament. Once it got in, it defeated Rice and then defeated Baylor at the Waco Super Regional to advance to the College World Series.

2012 College World Series

Arkansas won its first game in Omaha, defeating Kent State 8-1. The Razorbacks then ended South Carolina's 22-game postseason win streak with a 2-1 victory. The Gamecocks got them back though, winning 2-0 and 3-2 in the next two games to advance to the final, only to lose to upstart Arizona in the best-of-three championship series.

2015
After an extremely slow start to the 2015 campaign, where the Razorbacks were .500 going into April, Van Horn rallied the troops and the team responded by winning seven of its last eight SEC series and finished fifth overall in the SEC, and third in the West behind No. 2 national seed LSU and Texas A&M.
Arkansas won the Stillwater Regional by defeating Oral Roberts, host Oklahoma State and St. John's in succession. The Razorbacks then caught a break by getting to host the Fayetteville Super Regional at Baum Stadium because Missouri State, the No. 8 national seed, couldn't host because it shares Hammons Field with the Springfield Cardinals. It took all three games of the best-of-3 series, but Arkansas defeated the Bears to clinch Van Horn's sixth trip to Omaha overall and fourth with the Razorbacks, tying him with former coach Norm DeBriyn.

2015 College World Series
Arkansas lost both games it played in Omaha in 2015, which was the first time since 2004 that the Razorbacks did not win a game there. They fell to Virginia in the CWS opener, 5-3, and then fell to Miami in an elimination game, 4-3.

2018
The Razorbacks came into the 2018 season with enormous expectations, and they lived up to those expectations. Arkansas earned a share of the SEC Western Division title with Ole Miss, and secured the No. 5 overall national seed in the NCAA Tournament.

Arkansas hosted a regional at Baum Stadium, dispatching Oral Roberts, Southern Miss and Dallas Baptist in consecutive games in the Fayetteville Regional to advance to the Super Regional, also in Fayetteville, with SEC foe South Carolina. The 3-game series went the distance before the Razorbacks defeated the Gamecocks to clinched its fifth trip to Omaha of Van Horn's tenure, and ninth in program history, with a 14-4 victory on June 11.

2018 College World Series
Arkansas won its opening game in Omaha against former Southwest Conference rival Texas, 11-5. The game was delayed by weather in the sixth inning for nearly three hours.

Arkansas then defeated another former SWC foe in Texas Tech, upending the Red Raiders 7-4. This game was delayed by inclement weather twice. Originally scheduled for 7 p.m. on June 19, the game was rescheduled for 11 a.m. on June 20. Thunderstorms delayed the game further, and was finally played at 2:30 p.m. that afternoon.

Arkansas defeated Florida in an elimination game for the Gators to earn a trip to the CWS finals against the Oregon State Beavers. The Razorbacks took game 1 of the series after it was delayed a day by weather, 4-1.

The Razorbacks were on the verge of securing their first baseball national championship but misplayed a foul ball with two outs in the 9th inning of Game 2, which would have ended the series and given Arkansas the title. It left the door open and the Beavers won the game and won the rubber game the following evening, forcing Arkansas to settle for a national runner-up finish.

2021

After seeing the previous season be cut short after just 16 games, Arkansas went into the 2021 season with high expectations, looking to make its third consecutive trip to Omaha.

The Razorbacks spent the campaign being ranked No. 1 for nearly all of it, and ended up winning the SEC title outright for the first time since 1999 and won the SEC Tournament for the first time under Van Horn.

It was also the first time since 1989 that the team won 50 games and the fourth time in school history. Arkansas hosted a regional and defeated NJIT and Nebraska twice to advance to the Super Regional, before succumbing to NC State in three games to not make the College World Series for the first time since 2017.

2022

Arkansas spent much of the season ranked in the top five, eager to follow up on a terrific 2021 campaign but also to get the sour taste of not getting to Omaha out of their mouths.

A late season swoon kept them from hosting a regional for the first time since 2015, where the team had to go to Stillwater in a regional but got to host the super regional at Baum-Walker Stadium.

This time, the team went to Stillwater again, dispatching Grand Canyon and #7 national seed Oklahoma State twice to advance to the super regional, where the Razorbacks had to travel to Chapel Hill. Arkansas upended the #10 national seed Tar Heels in two games to secure Van Horn's seventh trip to Omaha as the Hog boss and ninth overall.

2022 College World Series

Arkansas opened its Omaha slate by walloping #2 national seeded Stanford 17-2, the highest victory margin for a Razorback team in the College World Series and tallied 21 hits, an Omaha record.

The Razorbacks dropped their next game to Ole Miss, and had to win an elimination game against division rival Auburn to play Ole Miss again. Arkansas beat the Rebels on Wednesday, June 22, but had to do it twice to advance to the championship series, and the following day Ole Miss' Dylan DeLucia threw a complete-game shutout to end Arkansas' season.

Head coaching record

See also
List of current NCAA Division I baseball coaches

Notes and references

External links
 

1960 births
Living people
Central Missouri Mules baseball coaches
Nebraska Cornhuskers baseball coaches
Northwestern State Demons baseball coaches
Arkansas Razorbacks baseball players
Arkansas Razorbacks baseball coaches
Pulaski Braves players
Durham Bulls players
Anderson Braves players
McLennan Highlanders baseball players
Sportspeople from Fayetteville, Arkansas
American people of Dutch descent
People from Stanton, California
Sportspeople from Orange County, California
Baseball players from California
Baseball players from Kansas City, Missouri